Rich Parker (born 5 February 1987 in Birmingham) is a British professional vert skater. Parker started skating when he was ten years old in 1997 and turned professional in 2004, at the age of 17. He has attended many competitions in his vert skating career, regularly competing on the pro tour. Since becoming professional, Rich has produced an impressive competitive record, including a world X-Games Silver medal as well as winning the European Championships for three consecutive years. Rich Parker still remains the number one ranked halfpipe inline skater in the United Kingdom.

Best Tricks: Flatspin 900, 1080, 1260.

Vert Competitions
2017 – European Champion – (1st)
2016 – British Champion – (1st)
2016 – NASS, England – (1st)
2016 – Bunker, Italy – (1st)
2015 – NL Contest, France – (2nd)
2015 – ICR, Italy – (2nd)
2015 – X Masters, Italy – (1st)
2015 – NASS, England – (3rd)
2014 – MSS, Bulgaria – (2nd)
2014 – Roll Line, England – (1st)
2013 – European Champion – (1st)
2012 – Asian X Games, Shanghai, China – (4th)
2012 – NL Contest, Strasbourg, France – (1st)
2012 – Chewits Xtreme Inline Open, Birmingham – (1st)
2012 – European Championship Halfpipe, Copenhagen, Denmark – (1st)
2012 – King of Warriors 2, Barcelona, Spain – (1st)
2012 – ProRad, São Paulo, Brazil – (3rd)
2011 – Asian X Games, Shanghai, China – (2nd)
2011 – European Championships, Rotterdam, Netherlands – (1st)
2011 – King of Warriors, Barcelona, Spain – (2nd)
2006 – LG Action Sports World Championships, Dallas, TX, USA – (6th)
2006 – LG Action Sports World Tour, Amsterdam, Netherlands – (7th)
2005 – LG Action Sports World Championship, Manchester, England – (6th)

References

External links

actionsportstour.com
actionsportstour.com
chewitsxtreme.co.uk
rollingupdates.com
chewitsxtreme.co.uk
online-skating.com
espn.go.com
sportingchampions.org.uk

1987 births
Living people
Vert skaters
X Games athletes